Kresten Bjerre (22 February 1946 – 19 February 2014) was a Danish footballer, who played professionally for Houston Stars in the United States, and European clubs PSV Eindhoven and R.W.D. Molenbeek.

Nicknamed "Generalen" (the General), the defender obtained a total 22 caps for the Danish national team, for which he scored twelve goals in the late 1960s and early 1970s.

Playing career

Club
Born in Copenhagen, Bjerre started playing football with local clubs Boldklubben Sylvia and Akademisk Boldklub (AB). He helped AB win the 1967 Danish football championship, and made his national team debut in May 1967. He played eight national team games until October 1967, scoring eight goals. He scored a hat-trick against Iceland, in a most remarkable 14-2 victory. He also scored two goals as Denmark beat the Netherlands 3-2 in the qualification for the 1968 European Championship.

In early 1968, he moved abroad to play professionally for American team Houston Stars in the NASL championship. Due to the Danish rules of amateurism, his national team career went on a hiatus. He played the 1968 season for Houston Stars, When the team folded after the season, Bjerre moved back to Europe. He went on to play for PSV Eindhoven in the Netherlands. In 1969, he moved on to Belgian club R.W.D. Molenbeek. He was one of the best paid footballers in the Belgian League, and was the first foreign player to be named team captain in Belgian football. While at Molenbeek, the Danish rules of amateurism were abolished, and Bjerre re-entered the Danish national team in May 1971. He played 14 additional national team games, scoring a further four goals. In his last 13 Danish national games, Kresten Bjerre served as national team captain.

The lacking professionalism of the Danish national team did not sit well with Bjerre, and he became a Belgian citizen in order for Danish international Benny Nielsen to take his place in Molenbeek's restricted quota of foreign players. This meant Bjerre's final farewell to the Danish national team in November 1973, though he changed back to Danish citizenship after retiring. Bjerre went on to concentrate on his Molenbeek career, and won the 1975 Belgian League championship with the team. He was a part of the Molenbeek team that reached the semi-finals of the European 1977 UEFA Cup tournament, before retiring at the end of that season.

Managerial career
He moved back to Denmark, where he became a football coach. Under his coaching, Køge BK reached the 1979 Danish Cup final, where the team lost to B 1903. He later coached Holbæk B&I, Herfølge BK, and AB, as well as a number of minor Danish clubs. He went on to become the park manager of BK Frem's stadium Valby Idrætspark. Bjerre died from cancer in early 2014.

Honours
Belgian League: 1975
Danish championship: 1967

References

External links

Danish national team profile
 Peder's Fodboldstatistik profile
Houston Stars stats

'

1946 births
2014 deaths
Association football defenders
Danish men's footballers
Denmark international footballers
Denmark under-21 international footballers
Akademisk Boldklub players
Houston Stars players
PSV Eindhoven players
R.W.D. Molenbeek players
Go Ahead Eagles players
Eredivisie players
Belgian Pro League players
North American Soccer League (1968–1984) players
Danish expatriate men's footballers
Expatriate footballers in the Netherlands
Expatriate footballers in Belgium
Expatriate soccer players in the United States
Danish football managers
Køge Boldklub managers
Holbæk B&I managers
Herfølge Boldklub managers
Akademisk Boldklub managers
Deaths from cancer in Denmark
People from Frederikssund Municipality
Sportspeople from the Capital Region of Denmark